Wyoming Highway 410 (WYO 410) is a  state highway in Uinta County, Wyoming, United States, that connects areas west of Roberston with Mountain View.

Route description
For its entire length, WYO 410 runs through rural flatland as a two-lane road.

East–west section
(CR 204 continues westerly toward Piedmont - a former small railroad and timber settlement which has become a ghost town.) About  from its southern terminus WYO 410, connects with the eastern end of Uinta County Road 271 (CR 271) at a Y intersection. (CR 271 heads southerly to the Meeks Cabin Reservoir near the Utah State Line.) From its southern terminus WYO 410 runs east-southeasterly for just under  before reaching the southern end of Uinta County Road 275 at a T intersection.

Heading easterly, WYO 410 quickly crosses Blacks Fork and, shortly thereafter, connects with the north end of Uinta County Road 273 at a T intersection. About  later, after assuming a due east course and crossing both Willow Creek and Smiths Fork, WYO 410 reaches a junction with the south end of Uinta County Road 261 and the north end of Uinta County Road 279 (CR 279) on the western edge of the census-designated place of Robertson. (CR 279 heads southerly toward the Uinta-Wasatch-Cache National Forest.) Still heading due east, WYO 410 runs through Robertson, passing by its post office along the way.

WYO 410 arrives at a junction with the south end of Uinta County Road 263 (CR 263) and the north end of Uinta County Road 274 (CR 274) on the eastern edge of Robertson. (CR 263 heads northerly to end at Wyoming Highway 411 [WYO 411]. CR 279 heads south and then west along the edge of Robertson to end at CR 279.) In the middle of the curve, WYO 410 has a junction with the north end of Uinta County Road 283 (CR 283) at a T intersection. (CR 283 heads southerly toward the Uinta-Wasatch-Cache National Forest.)

North–south section
About  after turning north, WYO 410 connects with the east end of Uinta County Road 270 at a T intersection. Shortly thereafter, the highway curves to head very briefly east before curving back to head north on the Tipperary Bench Nearly  later the highway connects with the east end of Uinta County Road 266 at a T intersection. About  farther north WYO 410 curves to head northeast and descend the Tipperary Bench. After about  farther on its northeast course, WYO 410 reaches its junction with the west end of Wyoming Highway 411 (WYO 411) at a T intersection, just west of the north end of Tipperary Bench. (WYO 410 heads west toward the unincorporated community of Millburne.)

(West Street continues north for several blocks.) After turning east, WYO 410 crosses Spruce, Pine, and Cedar streets, before connecting with the north end of Birch Street on the south side of Mountain View Middle School. Just after connecting with the south end of North Alder Street, WYO 410 reaches is eastern terminus at it junction with Wyoming Highway 414 (WYO 414) at a T intersection. (WYO 414 heads north through Urie and Lyman before ending at an interchange with Interstate 80 and Wyoming Highway 412. WYO 414 head southeasterly through Lonetree and McKinnon before ending at the Utah State Line.)

History
WYO 410 was established in June 1971.

Major intersections

See also

 List of state highways in Wyoming

References

External links

 Wyoming State Routes 400-499
 WYO 410 - WYO 414 to WYO 411
 WYO 410 - WYO 411 to Uinta CR 261

Transportation in Uinta County, Wyoming
410